is a Shintō shrine in the city of Hirosaki in Aomori Prefecture, Japan. It is the ichinomiya of former Tsugaru Domain. All of Mount Iwaki is considered to be a portion of the shrine.

The main festival of the shrine, the Oyama-sankei, features a parade from the shrine to the top of the mountain, and is held annually at the time of the autumn equinox. The pilgrims carry colorful banners and are accompanied by traditional drums and flutes

Enshrined kami

History
The foundation of the Iwakiyama Shrine predates the historical period, and Mount Iwaki was a holy mountain for the local Emishi tribes. Per shrine tradition, the shrine was established on the summit of Mount Iwaki in the year 780. It was rebuilt by the folk-hero Sakanoue no Tamuramaro in the year 800 and dedicated to his father Sakanoue no Karitamaro. The three main peaks on Mount Iwaki were identified with the Buddhist deities of Amida Nyorai, Yakushi Nyorai and Kannon Bosatsu.

During the Meiji period’s government-ordered separation of Buddhism from Shinto, the temple became a Shinto shrine. In 1871, it was officially designated one of the  Kokuhei Shōsha (国幣小社), or 3rd ranked national shrine under the State Shinto system until 1946.

Notable structures
Many of the structures of Iwakiyama Shrine date from the early Edo period, and were built in 1694 under the sponsorship of the Tsugaru clan of Hirosaki Domain. The two-story main gate (Ryōmon) was built in 1628. The Honden, Heiden, Oku-no-mon and Ryōmon are built in the yosegi-zukuri style with decorative wood carvings, which have given the shrine its nickname of “Oku-Nikko” after the more famous structures of the Nikkō Tōshō-gū. All of these buildings are registered as National Important Cultural Properties.

See also
 List of Shinto shrines
 Modern system of ranked Shinto Shrines

References
 Plutschow, Herbe. Matsuri: The Festivals of Japan. RoutledgeCurzon (1996) 
 Ponsonby-Fane, Richard Arthur Brabazon. (1962).   Studies in Shinto and Shrines. Kyoto: Ponsonby Memorial Society. OCLC 3994492
 Graham, Patricia J. Faith and Power in Japanese Buddhist Art, 1600-2005. University of Hawaii Press (2008)

Notes

External links

Aomori Jinja Honcho Official site of the shrine
Aomori Prefectural site
Oyama-mairi

Shinto shrines in Aomori Prefecture
Hirosaki
Beppyo shrines